Rivadavia is a department of the province of Salta (Argentina).

Municipalities and villages 
The department of Rivadavia comprises three municipalities:

 Coronel Juan Solá
 Rivadavia Banda Sur
 Santa Victoria Este

Furthermore, the following villages are part of the department of Rivadavia:

 Alto de la Sierra
 Capitan Juan Pagé
 La Unión
 Los Blancos
 Santa María
 Santa Rosa
 Pluma de Pato

References 

Departments of Salta Province